Mavrolithari is a village on Mount Oeta in northern Phocis, Greece, at an altitude of  1.140 meters. Since the 2011 local government reform it is part of the municipality of Delphi, and the municipal unit of Kallieis. Population was 491 in the 2011 census.

History 
Mavrolithari was burnt during the Axis occupation of Greece. During the Italian mopping up operations in May 1943 there was a military campaign by ELAS Ladiou that used Mavrolithari as their base.

References

Populated places in Phocis
Mount Oeta